Taavet Avarmaa (born David Akermann; 22 September 1900 Tahkuranna Parish (now Häädemeeste Parish), Kreis Pernau – 1 October 1982 Haapsalu) was an Estonian jurist and politician. He was a member of Estonian National Assembly.

References

1900 births
1982 deaths
People from Häädemeeste Parish
People from Kreis Pernau
Members of the Estonian National Assembly
Estonian jurists